Family Guy: Back to the Multiverse is an action-adventure third-person shooter video game developed by Heavy Iron Studios and published by Activision. The game is based on the American animated television series Family Guy, most notably the episode "Road to the Multiverse", and was also a continuation of the episode "The Big Bang Theory". It also featured the return of Stewie's evil half-brother Bertram, who was killed in the show. The game was released in North America on November 20, 2012, in Australia on November 21, 2012, and in Europe on November 23, 2012, for Microsoft Windows, PlayStation 3, and Xbox 360. It was the first Family Guy console game since Family Guy Video Game! in 2006.

Upon release, Family Guy: Back to the Multiverse received negative reviews. While praise fell towards its humor, characters, and return of the original cast, the game was criticized for its gameplay, graphics, and story. When the game was available for pre-order, people who pre-ordered the game received a special level, based on Aliens: Colonial Marines, another video game based on the Aliens trademark also owned by 20th Century Fox, which was released the next February to similar negative reception.

In December 2014, Family Guy: Back to the Multiverse was removed from Steam.

Gameplay
Players control Stewie Griffin and Brian Griffin in an adventure that pitted them against Stewie's evil half-brother, Bertram. Back to the Multiverse featured both co-operative and competitive multiplayer modes built around the characters. Extra challenge levels, multiplayer maps, costumes, and playable Family Guy characters were unlocked through gameplay.

Plot
Brian and Stewie are spending time at home when Bertram appears out of nowhere in a flash of light. Stewie is appalled by this, as he had killed Bertram in the past. Bertram responds by explaining that he is from another reality where Stewie never killed him, and expresses his disgust that there exists a universe without him in it. Bertram then exclaims that because of this, he will build an army from all the depths of the Multiverse, and use it destroy Stewie's universe entirely. After Bertram uses his remote to travel out of their realm, Stewie takes out his own Multiverse remote and declares that he and Brian will stop Bertram at all costs. They then travel out of their world and try to track Bertram down, but are forced to encounter his army along the way. Some members of this army are characters from the TV series, such as Ernie the Giant Chicken, Long John Peter, Evil Stewie from "The Hand That Rocks the Wheelchair", Crippletron from "No Meals on Wheels", and Santa Claus's work-overwhelmed disfigured Christmas elves from "Road to the North Pole". Stewie and Brian follow Bertram through seven different universes:

 The first universe Stewie and Brian go to was a universe ruled by Greek college students.
 The second universe was one that is ruled by the Amish (whom Bertram gave quick-growth seeds to in exchange for the promise that they build him a weapon).
 The third universe was ruled by handicapped people because they were given a lot of "special treatment" resulting them to lead to power.
 The fourth universe was one where everyone is evil (making Quahog into a war zone).
 The fifth universe was where pirates became dominant.
 The sixth universe was where there is no need for Santa Claus since everyone buys their Christmas gifts online, causing Santa to become an arms dealer for Bertram.
 The seventh and final universe was where the Earth is being invaded by Alien Chickens from outer space.

When Stewie and Brian return to their universe in an airport, Peter (who was on the chicken ship held captive) came back with Ernie, the giant chicken, Peter's arch enemy, while Stewie and Brian went to stop Bertram, Peter and The giant chicken engage in a furious battle, when the showdown was taken outside Peter threw the giant chicken in an airplane engine, shredding him to pieces and presumably killing him.  After the showdown, Peter then walks away, without knowing the giant chicken's eyes open, meaning that he's still alive.

After Stewie and Brian make it to the town square, they are shocked to discover that even though they had dismantled all the army forces Bertram had constructed throughout the Multiverse, their town had been purged into chaos. After a few more seconds, Bertram appears with a weaponized Tyrannosaurus, and welcomes Stewie back home. It is then revealed that Bertram had not actually been assembling armies within the universes Brian and Stewie had traveled to, but rather was simply trying to lure the two into dangerous environments to get rid of them, while his assistant, Gus, was assembling an army of alternate reality versions of Bertram himself, which appear along with the T-Rex. Bertram then exclaims that he had finally created a bomb that can exponentially tear a universe apart. Due to the fact that traveling through universes creates tears in reality, Bertram's bomb can expand these tears and start a chain reaction that will suck Stewie's entire universe into oblivion. The most tears in Stewie's world are near his house, as that is where Brian, Stewie, and Bertram all traveled out of. This is where Bertram is headed for the bomb to activate. After the Tyrannosaurus ruthlessly devours an innocent bystander, Stewie and Brian arm themselves and battle both the Tyrannosaurus and Bertram's army. The fight continues all the way to Stewie's house, where two possible endings are present:

 If Stewie and Brian defeat the Tyrannosaurus, Bertram falls out, begs Stewie to not kill him, and states that they could rule the multiverse together. Stewie refuses, but rather than killing Bertram, he and Brian feed him to the Tyrannosaurus, who is then shot to death after eating Bertram. The Griffin family is happy that Stewie and Brian are okay, but Brian worries that another Bertram will come from another universe and try to destroy Stewie and Brian. Stewie says that will depend on how much money the game will make them, breaking the fourth wall.
 However, If the T-Rex makes it to the Griffin Family House, an alternate and bad ending will be shown where Bertram declares his victory, activates the bomb within the T-Rex's back, and travels out of their universe. After the T-Rex eats Meg, Brian ponders what happens next, only for the entire world to be blown up. However, as Peter Griffin hurdles himself through the emptiness of space, he giggles and says, "You lose".

Development
According to Unseen64, ports for Wii and Nintendo 3DS were planned, but both were cancelled in August 2011 according to a former employee of Heavy Iron Studios, due to the focus "on making one version of the game and growing concerns about how [the game] would perform on those platforms." As a result, it was not released on any Nintendo systems.

Reception

Family Guy: Back to the Multiverse received "generally unfavorable" reviews on all platforms according to the review aggregation website Metacritic.

Andrew Reiner of Game Informer said that half of the Xbox 360 version is done exceptionally well, while the other half is the polar opposite. He also stated, "The gameplay could fuel any generic shooter, and doesn't feel like it belongs with this property." The game received a mixed review from IGN who said of the PlayStation 3 and Xbox 360 versions, "There's a lot to enjoy, but none of it will knock your socks off." Official Xbox Magazine UKs review was a questionnaire in which the reader could score the game themselves, with the final score out of ten being decided by how many boxes they ticked, the final box being "I'm a frothing imbecile who deserves nothing of value in my life." The review concluded that the game was for "no-one. Not even people who like the TV show" and "These writers hate humanity." The only positive mention given of the game was "It certainly looks the part."

Edd Harwood of The Digital Fix gave the PS3 version three out of ten, saying that it was "a really bad game. It is not the worst game though because some games I play do not work sometimes or are even more stupid. Family Guy: Back to the Multiverse is at least a game that I can play and shoot things, and maybe laugh at something that reminds me of the show. But the shooting is really bad. The multiplayer is also not so bad. But I would much rather watch the show. Or play something else." Digital Spy gave the Xbox 360 version one star out of five and stated, "There is surely scope to make a decent Family Guy game - just imagine an adventure or puzzle title littered with acerbic humor and smart observations. But as a shooter, Back to the Multiverse is a hopelessly moronic, completely pointless experience that will please neither Family Guy fans nor people who enjoy games. In this case, the joke is most definitely on us." Metro GameCentral gave said console version a similar score of a two out of ten and called it "a return to the very worst standards of video game tie-ins, with terrible gameplay and an equally incompetent attempt to mimic the show's humour."

References

External links
Official website

2012 video games
Action-adventure games
Third-person shooters
Multiplayer and single-player video games
Activision games
PlayStation 3 games
Video games based on Family Guy
Windows games
Xbox 360 games
Video games about parallel universes
Split-screen multiplayer games
Cancelled Wii games
Cancelled Nintendo 3DS games
Video games using Havok
Video games with cel-shaded animation
Video games with alternate endings
Video games set in Rhode Island
Video games developed in the United States